Peter A. Velis (born October 8, 1942) is a former American judge who served on the Massachusetts Superior Court from 1999 to 2012. From 1973 to 1979 he was a Republican state legislator who served in the Massachusetts House of Representatives, representing the Fifth Hampden district from Westfield, Massachusetts.

References

1942 births
Living people
Boston University alumni
Massachusetts state court judges
Republican Party members of the Massachusetts House of Representatives
People from Westfield, Massachusetts
Suffolk University Law School alumni